Robinsonia irregularis is a moth in the family Erebidae. It was described by Rothschild in 1917. It is found in Brazil (Mato Grosso).

References

Natural History Museum Lepidoptera generic names catalog

Moths described in 1917
Robinsonia (moth)